Dolichophis schmidti, known commonly as the red-bellied racer and Schmidt's whip snake, is a species of snake in the family Colubridae. The species is endemic to Western Asia.

Geographic range
D. schmidti is found in the Caucasus and the Middle East, from Dagestan to Turkmenistan and south into Syria, Jordan, and northern Iran.

Habitat
D. schmidti occurs in a wide variety of habitats including rocky, stony and bushy river banks, deserts, semi-deserts, rocky outcrops, hillsides, montane steppe, cultivated fields, gardens, vineyards and other rural areas. It can occur close to human habitation and tolerates human disturbance.

Diet
D. schmidti is often observed near to large colonies of rodents on which it preys. It also preys on lizards, birds, and snakes.

Reproduction
Adult females of D. schmidti lay clutches of between 5 and 11 eggs.

Etymology
The specific name, schmidti, is in honor of Russian ichthyologist Petr Yulevich Schmidt.

References

External links

Dolichophis
Reptiles described in 1909
Snakes of Jordan
Reptiles of Central Asia
Taxa named by Alexander Nikolsky
Reptiles of Russia